Juan Pablo Pérez Alfonzo Airport , is an airport serving El Vigía, a city in Mérida state in Venezuela. It opened in 1991, and was named for the Venezuelan politician Juan Pablo Pérez Alfonzo (1903–1979).

The runway length includes a  displaced threshold on Runway 27.

The El Vigia non-directional beacon (Ident: EVG) is located on the field.

Airlines and destinations

Notes

See also
Transport in Venezuela
List of airports in Venezuela

References

External links
OurAirports - El Vigía
SkyVector - El Vigia
OpenStreetMap - Juan Pablo Pérez Alfonzo

Airports in Venezuela
Buildings and structures in Mérida (state)
Buildings and structures in El Vigia